Clivina denticollis is a species of ground beetle in the subfamily Scaritinae. It was described by Sloane in 1896.

References

denticollis
Beetles described in 1896